Daphne esquirolii is a shrub, of the family Thymelaeaceae.  It is deciduous, and is found in Sichuan and Yunnan.

Description
The shrub grows to a height of 0.5 to 1.5 m.  Its flowers are small, and grow in groups.  It does not produce visible fruit.  It is generally found at altitudes from 700 to 2000 m, but sometimes as high as 3400 m.

Subspecies
Two subspecies are recognized, the nominate subspecies Daphne esquirolii subsp. esquirolii and Daphne esquirolii subsp. pedunculata (H.F.Zhou ex C.Yung Chang) Halda. D. esquirolii subsp. pedunculata differs in having the young shoots and the peduncles and pedicels of the inflorescence densely covered with short yellowish hairs (tomentose) and lanceolate or oblanceolate leaves. It is recognized as a separate species, Daphne pedunculata, by the Flora of China. It is found in south-east Yunnan, China, where it grows in dry valleys and sandy shrubby slopes at around 400 m.

References

equirolii